Koës is a village in the ǁKaras Region of south-eastern Namibia. It is situated on the edge of the Kalahari desert and belongs to the Keetmanshoop Rural electoral constituency. The average annual rainfall is about 150-200 mm.

Economy and infrastructure 
The vast majority of income is generated on ranches in the surrounding area and stem from sheep, goat and cattle ranching for meat production purposes. The most common sheep breed ranched with is the Dorper, with Persian, Damara, Van Rooy, Karakul and others to a lesser extent. Popular cattle breeds for this area are Nguni, Bonsmara, Brahman and various others to a lesser extent. Various sheep, cattle and goat stud breeders are registered in the area.

During the months of May - Aug (winter) meat hunting takes place widely. Huntable species are Oryx (gemsbok), Springbok and Kudu. To a lesser extent trophy hunting is also available.

Koës has a government primary school. There is also a post office, police station, village council, hotel, library, farmer's cooperative, general dealer and coffee shop.

The annual Koës Pan Rally is a DIY motorsports event that originated in 1985, held in the first week of July.

Politics

Koës is governed by a village council that  has five seats.

The 2015 local authority election was won by the SWAPO party which gained three seats (336 votes). One seat each went to the Democratic Turnhalle Alliance (DTA, 105 votes) and the Rally for Democracy and Progress (RDP, 57 votes). In the 2020 local authority election "serious procedural errors" were discovered for the Koës village council. Some voters had been handed ballot papers meant for Keetmanshoop. No initial result were announced, and the electoral court ordered a re-run. The re-run was conducted on 26 February 2021 and won by the newly formed Landless People's Movement (LPM). LPM gained 376 votes and three seats in the village council, followed by SWAPO with two seats (274 votes).

References

Villages in Namibia
Populated places in the ǁKaras Region